This article contains information about the literary events and publications of 1556.

Events
Unknown dates
The first printing press in India is introduced by Jesuits at Saint Paul's College, Goa.
The first written evidence of Yakshagana dance-drama is found on an inscription at the Lakshminarayana Temple, Hosaholalu in India.
Augustus, Elector of Saxony, establishes a royal state library in Dresden, predecessor of the Saxon State and University Library Dresden.

New books

Prose
Georg Bauer – De re metallica
John Ponet – A Short Treasure of Politic Power

Poetry
Pierre de Ronsard – Les Hymnes

Births
March 7 – Guillaume du Vair, French lawyer and philosopher (died 1621)
April 27 – François Béroalde de Verville, French novelist and poet (died 1626)
July 25 (baptised) – George Peele, English dramatist and poet (died 1596)
August 10 – Philipp Nicolai, German poet and composer (died 1608)
November 15 – Jacques Davy Duperron, French poet, cardinal and politician (died 1618)
November 25 (baptised) – John Heminges, English actor and editor of the First Folio (died 1630)
Unknown date – John Paul Nazarius, Italian theologian (died 1645)

Deaths
April 26 – Valentin Friedland, German scholar and teacher (born 1490)
May 7 – Hieronymus Andreae, German printer and publisher (date of birth unknown)
July 31 – Ignatius of Loyola, Spanish theologian, founder of the Jesuits (born 1491)
October 21 – Pietro Aretino, Italian satirist (born 1492)
October 31 – Johannes Sleidanus, Luxembourgeois historian (born 1506)
November 14 – Giovanni della Casa, Florentine poet (born 1503)
December 23 – Nicholas Udall, English dramatist (born 1504)
Unknown dates 
Fuzûlî, Ottoman poet and philosopher (born c.1483)
Oddur Gottskálksson, Icelandic translator (born 1514/1515)

References

Years of the 16th century in literature